Stardust, in comics, may refer to:

 Stardust (Marvel Comics)
 Stardust the Super Wizard

See also
Stardust (disambiguation)